Lividomycin is a broad-spectrum aminoglycoside antibiotic. It is effective against most gram positive and gram negative bacteria including Mycobacterial tuberculosis (the causative agent of tuberculosis) and Pseudomonas aeruginosa.

References 

Aminoglycoside antibiotics